KLAX-FM (97.9 MHz) is an American commercial radio station located in East Los Angeles, California, broadcasting to the Greater Los Angeles area.  KLAX-FM airs a regional Mexican music format branded as "La Raza".  The station has studios in Los Angeles, and its transmitter is based in Glendale.

History

KNOB
The station began broadcasting on April 22, 1949, holding the call sign KNOB. It originally broadcast at 103.1 MHz and was licensed to Long Beach, California.

On August 18, 1957, the station switched to an all jazz format, becoming the world's first all-jazz station. It was branded "The Jazz Knob". Its owner was Sleepy Stein, who was able to get permission from the Federal Communications Commission for a power increase by switching the frequency to 97.9 in 1958. It broadcast from a studio at their transmitter site atop Signal Hill, near Long Beach Airport. The building and tower remain to this day, though the station has moved away to Flint Peak near Glendale.  The station's original high-power transmitter was a Western Electric 10 kW that had previously been installed at KNX-FM.

In 1966, the station was sold to Jeanette Pennino Banoczi and husband Jack Banoczi, owners of the Pennino Music Company, for $262,850. KNOB's studios were moved to Anaheim, California. Later that year, the station switched to an all-request middle of the road (MOR) format, with ethnic programming on Sundays.

KNOB would later air a beautiful music format. In the early 1980s, the station began airing a syndicated MOR format. In September 1985, it adopted a soft adult contemporary "love songs" format branded "For Lovers Only".

KSKQ-FM
In 1988, KNOB was sold to Spanish Broadcasting System for $15 million and its call sign was changed to KSKQ-FM. The station aired a Spanish-language adult contemporary format.

KLAX-FM
In 1992, under the direction of general manager Alfredo Rodriguez and consultant Alfredo Alonso, KSKQ-FM was turned into a Banda music station, KLAX-FM, branded "La Equis". In January 1993, KLAX-FM became the most-listened-to station in the market, the first Spanish-language station in Los Angeles to achieve this.

In 1998, KLAX-FM moved its city of license from Long Beach to East Los Angeles. In 2002, KLAX dropped the contemporary hits and went to a more focused regional format as "La Raza 97.9." In March 2017, KLAX began carrying the morning show hosted by Terry "El Terrible" Cortez, Kristel "La Kristy" Yañez, and Johnny "El Perro" Orta, of WLEY, "La Ley 107.9" in Chicago. The program also airs on KRZZ in San Francisco. Before joining KRZZ in 2014, Cortez and Yañez had been part of Eddie "Piolín" Sotelo's syndicated morning show for 12 years.

Immigration debate
Renán "El Cucuy" Almendárez Coello, the station's morning show host, helped coordinate a demonstration held on the streets of downtown Los Angeles on March 25, 2006. The event drew an estimated 500,000 participants and was a springboard to further similar events held throughout the United States.  The protesters marched in opposition to H.R. 4437, a proposal Congressional law that would theoretically make illegal immigration to the U.S. more difficult.  Coello received attention in various media following the original protests, including an appearance on Tom Leykis' English-language radio talk show.

References

External links
KLAX-FM official website

LAX-FM
Regional Mexican radio stations in the United States
LAX-FM
Spanish Broadcasting System radio stations
Eastside Los Angeles
Hispanic and Latino American culture in Los Angeles
Mexican-American culture in Los Angeles
Mass media in Los Angeles County, California
Radio stations established in 1949
1949 establishments in California